Borisovo is a rural locality (a village) in Posyolok Zolotkovo, Gus-Khrustalny District, Vladimir Oblast, Russia. The population was 10 as of 2010.

Geography 
The village is located 15 km north-east from Zolotkovo, 39 km east from Gus-Khrustalny.

References 

Rural localities in Gus-Khrustalny District
Melenkovsky Uyezd